The year 2008 is the 7th year in the history of the Universal Reality Combat Championship, a mixed martial arts promotion based in the Philippines. In 2008 the URCC held 5 events beginning with, URCC 12: Supremacy.

Events list

URCC Cebu 2

URCC Cebu 2 was an event held on March 1, 2008 at The Waterfront City Hotel in Cebu, Philippines.

Results

URCC 12: Supremacy

URCC 12: Supremacy was an event held on July 5, 2008 at A. Venue Events Hall in Makati, Metro Manila, Philippines.

Results

URCC Rouge Magazine's Black Tie Brawl 2008

URCC Rouge Magazine's Black Tie Brawl 2008 was an event held on October 18, 2008 at The Hyatt Hotel Manila in Metro Manila, Philippines.

Results

URCC Cebu 3: Nemesis

URCC Cebu 3: Nemesis was an event held on November 15, 2008 at The Cebu International Convention Centre in Cebu, Philippines.

URCC 13: Indestructible

URCC 13: Indestructible was an event held on November 22, 2008 at The A-Venue Events Hall in Makati, Metro Manila, Philippines.

Results

See also
 Universal Reality Combat Championship

References

Universal Reality Combat Championship events
2008 in mixed martial arts